The lowland shiner (Pteronotropis stonei) is a species of cyprinid fish endemic to the southeastern United States. It is found in the Peedee River drainage in South Carolina to Satilla River drainage in Georgia.

References 

 

Cyprinid fish of North America
Fish of the United States
Fish described in 1921
Pteronotropis